The Georgia Public Service Commission (PSC) is a statutory organ of the state government of Georgia; elected among five commission districts, the board consists of a Chairman, a Vice-chairman, and three Commissioners. PSC regulates  telecommunications, transportation, electric and natural gas services in the U.S. state of Georgia. Commissioners are elected in partisan elections statewide, though they must reside in a district.

The PSC is charged with protecting the public interest and promoting a healthy business-investment economy. The PSC is responsible for varying degrees of regulation in State telecommunications, gas, and electric companies and for establishing and enforcing the standards for quality of service. Unlike counterparts in other states, the Georgia PSC does not regulate water/sewer or gas providers.

History 

The regulatory functions of the PSC have changed dramatically since its founding. On October 14, 1879, Georgia became one of the first states to establish a regulatory agency to oversee railroad expansion and competition. Known as the Railroad Commission of Georgia, the commission consisted of three members who were appointed by the governor and served staggered six-year terms. In 1891 telegraph and express companies came under the commission's jurisdiction. By 1907 the commission began to regulate docks and wharves, as well as telephone, gas, and electric-power companies, and in 1931 its jurisdiction expanded to cover the trucking industry. In 1922 the Georgia legislature changed the agency's name to the Georgia Public Service Commission to reflect its expanded regulatory role.

PSC operations 

In 1907 the number of commissioners elected statewide was increased from three to five. Today the five elected commissioners are supported by approximately ninety staff members, and, usually,  every two years, the Chair is selected by the commission members. Beginning with the 2000 election year, each seat on the commission is assigned to one of five districts. Candidates for the commission must reside in the district with the available commission seat, although the entire state continues to vote for all five slots. Commissioners serve staggered six-year terms.

The commission depends primarily on appropriations from the Georgia General Assembly. In fiscal year 1999 the total budget of the PSC amounted to approximately $14 million, with approximately $9.5 million coming from the Georgia legislature and the remaining $4.4 million from the federal government and other funds. The fiscal year 2004 budget was $9.3 million.
When regulated utility companies bring a rate request before the PSC, the request is first addressed by one of the commission's four standing committees: telecommunications, energy, transportation, or policy development and intergovernmental affairs. The commissioners are assisted by experts on utility and transportation operations, who may provide testimony and make recommendations regarding rates or arbitration. The PSC makes decisions by a majority vote of the commissioners. It is authorized only to issue administrative orders. Furthermore, its rulings must be consistent with current legal standards and are subject to judicial review by the courts.

Regulatory functions of the PSC 

Although the PSC over the years has regulated the rates and service of the telecommunications, gas, and electric industries, today it does not regulate all utility companies within these sectors. The commission regulates only the rates charged and the services provided by most intrastate, investor-owned telecommunications, gas, and electric utilities operating in Georgia. The commission does not set rates for municipally owned electric and gas utilities or electric membership corporations, although these utilities consult the commission on such matters as financing and the resolution of territorial disputes. The commission also ensures the safety of all natural-gas pipelines in the state. The commission plays a smaller role with regard to the transportation sector. Its authority over truck and express companies and private and for-hire motor carriers is restricted to requiring proof of insurance and safety inspections.

Deregulation 

The deregulation of the telecommunications and natural gas industries in the 1990s greatly altered the regulatory functions of the PSC. Instead of regulating the rates of telephone and gas services, the commission plays a strong role as a manager and facilitator of open-market competition.

Telecommunications 

Georgia's Telecommunication and Competition Development Act of 1995 and the Federal Telecommunications Act of 1996 have greatly affected the telecommunications industry in Georgia. Both statutes sought to turn the traditional regulated monopoly service into a competitive market. Thus the commission no longer sets rates for telephone services but establishes and administers a universal access fund, which ensures reasonable access to services for customers; monitors rates and service quality; and mediates disputes between competitors. By the end of 2003 the number of certificated local competitive telephone exchange providers had grown to 221.

Natural gas 

More than 1.8 million Georgia customers use natural gas. In early 1997 Georgia became the first state to adopt legislation to deregulate natural gas with the Natural Gas Competition and Deregulation Act. The commission's role under the Natural Gas Act is similar to the one it plays in the telecommunications market: to facilitate the transition from a regulated monopoly to a competitive marketplace. As part of the deregulation process, the Atlanta Gas Light Company, which had long held a monopoly in the market, withdrew from selling natural gas to become a distributor of natural gas in 1999. Unregulated marketing companies now sell natural gas at variable prices, much in the way that long-distance telephone companies operate.

By all accounts Georgia's transition from monopoly to market competition has been very contentious. Several problems have plagued the deregulation process from the beginning, and unusually high gas prices have recently exacerbated the situation. As facilitator of the deregulation process, the PSC has played a high-profile role in several disputes. First, early in the deregulation process, the PSC settled several "slamming" cases with marketers. Slamming occurs when companies switch customers without their authorization. Second, after several marketers persistently billed customers incorrectly, the PSC resolved the billing disputes. Third, in November 2000 several marketers threatened to shut off service for nonpayment of bills. The PSC voted unanimously to impose an immediate moratorium through April 1, 2001, on shutoffs of gas service for residential customers. In January 2001, in a three-to-two vote, the PSC overrode protests from natural-gas marketers and enacted emergency rules to allow consumers who owe money in back bills to switch to marketers with lower prices.

Elections 
From 1877 to 1906, the Railroad Commission was a three-member body appointed by the governor and confirmed by the state senate. In 1906, the Georgia State Constitution reformed the Railroad Commission into a five-member body elected at-large statewide. In 1998, the General Assembly passed HB95, requiring members of the PSC to live in residency districts while retaining the requirement for candidates to run statewide. In 1996, Republicans gained a majority on the PSC for the first time, and would win all seats by 2006. 

The 1998 elections change was met since with criticism that the residency requirement diluted the voting power of Black residents in Georgia's racially-polarized voting environment. David Burgess, a Democrat who was appointed by Roy Barnes in 1998 to represent District 3, was the first African-American member of the PSC and won election to a full term in 2000, but was defeated for re-election in 2006 by Chuck Eaton. Successive African American party nominees, including Democrats and a Libertarian, have failed to win election to any seat on the PSC since. In addition, six runoff elections were held for seats on the PSC in 1992, 1998, 2006, 2008, 2018 and 2020, in which racial polarization resulted in candidates preferred most by African-American candidates were repeatedly defeated in runoff elections. After the 2020 PSC election, in which African-American Democrat Daniel Blackman was defeated in a run-off by District 4 incumbent Lauren "Bubba" McDonald (who won the most total votes of all three Republican statewide candidates on the runoff ballot, while both David Perdue and Kelly Loeffler lost their runoffs for U.S. Senate on the same ballot), a lawsuit was filed against the PSC election method by Georgia Conservation Voters, alleging that the method violated the Voting Rights Act of 1965. 

Other litigation occurred in 2022 regarding the residency requirement, with Gwinnett County resident Patty Durand having qualified for District 2 as a Democrat prior to the passage of legislation which redistricted Gwinnett County from District 2 to District 4. Following the passage of the legislation, Durand switched her residency into a county further into the newly-drawn District 2. Georgia Secretary of State Brad Raffensperger moved to remove Durand from the Democratic primary ballot for 2022 for residency, but was blocked by a state judge. Durand alleged that Gwinnett County was moved out of the district in order to deny a challenge to Republican incumbent Tim Echols. Other litigation was filed after the Democratic primary for District 3, in which Chandra Farley challenged Democratic nominee Shelia Edwards' residency in District 3.  

On August 5, 2022, Judge Steven D. Grimberg ruled in Rose v. Raffensperger that the requirement that candidates live in a district but be elected at-large statewide diluted Black voters' voting power and ordered Raffensperger to cancel the 2022 election until either a new election method is devised by the General Assembly or, failing that, devised by the court. The state appealed the ruling to the Eleventh Circuit Court of Appeals, which stayed Grimberg's ruling and restored the election to the ballot. On August 19, 2022, the Supreme Court of the United States issued a preliminary ruling vacating the 11th Circuit's stay of the Grimberg ruling, delaying the 2022 elections for PSC and directing the 11th Circuit to review the ruling; the Georgia Secretary of State's office did not contest the ruling, delaying the elections to 2023.

Members

See also 

 Public Utilities Commission

References

External links 

  Georgia Public Service Commission Website

Georgia
Public Service Commission
Georgia Public Service Commission